Almond milk is a plant-based milk with a watery texture and nutty flavor manufactured from almonds, although some types or brands are flavored in imitation of cow's milk. It does not contain cholesterol or lactose and is low in saturated fat. Almond milk is often consumed by those who are lactose-intolerant and others, such as vegans, who avoid dairy products. Commercial almond milk comes in sweetened, unsweetened, vanilla and chocolate flavors, and is usually fortified with micronutrients. It can also be made at home using a blender, almonds and water.

Global almond milk sales in 2018 were US$5.8 billion, growing at 14% per year, and forecast to be a $13 billion global market by 2025.

History

Almond milk was used as a substitute for animal milk in the Middle Ages in areas that followed Catholic fasting doctrines. Historian Carolyn Walker Bynum notes that:
... Medieval cookbooks suggest that the aristocracy observed fasting strictly, if legalistically. Meat-day and fish-day recipes were not separated in medieval recipe collections, as they were in later, better-organized cookbooks. But the most basic dishes were given in fast-day as well as
ordinary-day versions. For example, a thin split-pea puree, sometimes enriched with fish stock or almond milk (produced by simmering ground almonds in water), replaced meat broth on fast days; and almond milk was a general (and expensive) substitute for cow's milk.

Commerce
In the United States, almond milk remained a niche health food item until the early 2000s, when its popularity began to increase. In 2011 alone, almond milk sales increased by 79%. In 2013, it surpassed soy milk as the most popular plant-based milk in the US. As of 2014 it comprised 60 percent of plant-milk sales and 4.1 percent of total milk sales in the US.

Manufacturers and distributors of animal milk have advocated that plant-based milk not be labelled as "milk". They complain that consumers may be confused between the two, and that plant-based milks are not necessarily as nutritious in terms of vitamins and minerals. In the United States, as of 2021,  though the USDA is investigating and various state legislatures are considering regulation, various courts have determined that reasonable consumers are not confused, and the FDA has enacted no regulations against plant-based milk labels. European Union regulations require "milk" be used for animals only, except coconut milk. (See .)

Within the Italian regions of Sicily, Apulia, Calabria, and Campania, almond milk is a protected traditional agricultural product.

Brands include Almond Breeze, Elmhurst 1925, Mooala, Silk and Kirkland Signature.

Nutrition

If unfortified, almond milk has less vitamin D than fortified cows' milk; in North America, cows' milk must be fortified with vitamin D, but vitamins are added to plant milks on a voluntary basis. Vitamin E is released from the almonds and absorbed. The positive effects of the vitamin E includes strengthening the cells. Because of its low protein content, almond milk is not a suitable replacement for breast milk, cows' milk, or hydrolyzed formulas for children under two years of age.

Production
The general production method involves soaking and grinding almonds in an excess of water. A milky white liquid is obtained after filtering the almond pulp (flesh). Almond milk can also be made by adding water to almond butter. In commercial production, almond milk is homogenised with high pressure and pasteurised for greater stability and shelf life.

Almond milk can be stored in the fridge in an air-tight container (preferably glass container) for about 4-5 days. However, certain factors, such as temperature of the refrigerator, sterilization of the blender or storing jar, and surface cleanliness, can decide how many days you can keep it fresh. Remember, storing homemade almond milk for more than a week may reduce its nutrition or even make it unhealthy.

In July 2015, a class action lawsuit was filed in New York City against two American manufacturers, Blue Diamond Growers and White Wave Foods, for false advertising regarding the small quantity of almonds (only 2%) contained in the final product. In October 2015, a judge denied the plaintiff's request for an injunction.

Sustainability 

Almond production in California is concentrated mainly in the Central Valley, where the mild climate, rich soil, and abundant sunshine and water supply make for ideal growing conditions. Due to the persistent droughts in California in the early 21st century, it became more difficult to raise almonds in a sustainable manner.

Among plant-based milks, almond milk requires substantially more water during the growing and production stages than soy, rice or oat milk (graph). Dairy milk requires more water to produce than almond milk (graph). In 2014, California produced 42.3 billion pounds of cow's milk and only 2.14 billion pounds of almond milk.

Sustainability strategies implemented by the Almond Board of California and almond farmers include:
 tree and soil health, and other farming practices
 minimizing dust production during the harvest
 bee health
 irrigation guidelines for farmers
 food safety
 use of waste biomass as coproducts with a goal to achieve zero waste
 use of solar energy during processing
 job development
 support of scientific research to investigate potential health benefits of consuming almonds
 international education about sustainability practices

See also
Coconut milk
Oat milk
Plant milk
Soy milk

References

Almonds
Milk substitutes
Non-alcoholic drinks
Plant milk
Cold drinks
Vegetarianism and drinks
Vegan cuisine
Medieval cuisine